The canton of Hérouville-Saint-Clair is an administrative division of the Calvados department, northwestern France. It was created at the French canton reorganisation which came into effect in March 2015. Its seat is in Hérouville-Saint-Clair.

Composition

It consists of the following communes:
Colombelles
Hérouville-Saint-Clair

Councillors

In December 2015, Rodolphe Thomas resigned for accumulation of mandates. He is replaced by his substitute, Erwann Bernet.

Pictures of the canton

References

Cantons of Calvados (department)